Harry Bolton (March 24, 1919 – July 1986) was an American football player. 

Bolton was born in 1919 in Gray Horse, Oklahoma. He was an Osage Indian. As a teenager, he participated in the national skeet shooting tournament in 1935 and 1936. He finished fourth in 1935. He played college football for Oklahoma A&M in 1941. He then worked as a farmer in 1942 and 1943.

In 1944, he played professional football in the National Football League (NFL) as a tackle for the Detroit Lions. When he joined the Lions, he was forced to attend workouts in civilian clothes and shoes as the club did not have a uniform large enough for his 300-pound frame. Because of his mental effort, he was given the nickname "Little Beaver" while with the Lions. He appeared in one NFL game during the 1944 season.

References

1919 births
1986 deaths
Oklahoma State Cowboys football players
Detroit Lions players
Players of American football from Oklahoma